William Irons may refer to:

William Josiah Irons (1812–1883), Church of England priest and theological writer
Bill Irons, American anthropologist